Outat El Haj ( uṭaṭ l-ḥažž) is a town in Boulemane Province, Fès-Meknès, Morocco. According to the 2004 census it has a population of 13,945. The population consists primarily of Berber tribes from the villages in the middle Atlas mountains (Beni Hayoune, Oulad Ali, Tsiouant...) and Arab tribes from the low lands towards Guercif and Talsint.

Outat el Hadj is well known for its olive tree gardens and its exquisite olive oil.

References

Populated places in Boulemane Province
Municipalities of Morocco